Kosmos 2282 ( meaning Cosmos 2282) is a Russian US-KMO missile early warning satellite which was launched in 1994 as part of the Russian Space Forces' Oko programme. The satellite is designed to identify missile launches using infrared telescopes.

Kosmos 2282 was launched from Site 81/23 at Baikonur Cosmodrome in Kazakhstan. A Proton-K carrier rocket with a DM-2 upper stage was used to perform the launch, which took place at 23:58 UTC on 6 July 1994. The launch successfully placed the satellite into geostationary orbit. It subsequently received its Kosmos designation, and the international designator 1994-038A. The United States Space Command assigned it the Satellite Catalog Number 23168.

This satellite only worked for 17 months before failing.

See also

List of Kosmos satellites (2251–2500)

References

Spacecraft launched in 1994
Spacecraft launched by Proton rockets
Kosmos satellites
Oko